Complication or complications may refer to:

Dramatic arts
 "Complications" (CSI: Miami), an episode of CSI: Miami
 "Complications" (Terminator: The Sarah Connor Chronicles), an episode of Terminator: The Sarah Connor Chronicles
 Complications (TV series), a 2015 USA Network television series starring Jason O'Mara

Medicine
 Complication (medicine), an unfavorable evolution of a disease, health condition or  medical treatment

Music

Albums
 Complications - Trilogy of Intricacy, a 2005 EP by Norwegian progressive metal band Age of Silence
 Complications (Dover album), a 2015 album by Spanish rock band Dover

Songs
 "Complication", a 1999 song by Nine Inch Nails from The Fragile
 "Complications", a 2008 song by deadmau5 from Random Album Title

Technology
 Complication (horology), a clock display other than the time
 Smartwatch complication Complication (horology)#Use in smartwatches